The Alb Limes is a Roman frontier fortification or limes of the late 1st century AD in the Swabian Jura, also known as the Swabian Alb. The Alb Limes runs for just under 135 kilometres from Rottweil (Latin: Arae Flaviae) in the southwest to Heidenheim an der Brenz (Latin: Aquileia) in the northeast.

Literature 
 Regina Franke: Die Kastelle I und II von Arae Flaviae/Rottweil und die römische Okkupation des oberen Neckargebietes. Stuttgart, 2003,  (Forschungen und Berichte zur Vor- und Frühgeschichte in Baden-Württemberg, 93).
 Jörg Heiligmann: Der "Alb-Limes". Ein Beitrag zur römischen Besetzungsgeschichte Südwestdeutschlands. Stuttgart, 1990,  (Forschungen und Berichte zur Vor- und Frühgeschichte in Baden-Württemberg, 35).
 Friedrich Hertlein/Peter Goessler: Die Straßen und Wehranlagen des römischen Württemberg, Band 2 Straßen. In: Die Römer in Württemberg, Teil 2. Stuttgart, 1930
 Rainer Kreutle: Römische Straßen im Ulmer Raum In: B. Reinhardt, K. Wehrberger (eds.): Römer an Donau und Iller. Neue archäologische Forschungen und Funde. Jan Thorbecke Verlag, Sigmaringen, 1996 
 Oscar Paret: Württemberg in vor- und frühgeschichtlicher Zeit. Kohlhammer Verlag, Stuttgart, 1961

See also 
 Upper Germanic-Rhaetian Limes

Swabian Jura
Roman fortifications in Raetia
Roman frontiers
Heritage sites in Baden-Württemberg
Roman fortifications in Germany